Bixby is an unincorporated community in western Iron County, Missouri, United States.  It is located at the western intersection of Routes 32 and 49, approximately 22 miles east of Salem.

A post office called Bixby was established in 1906, and remained in operation until 1952. The community has the name of William K. Bixby, a railroad car manufacturer.

References

Unincorporated communities in Iron County, Missouri
Unincorporated communities in Missouri